The 2013 Royal Purple 300 was the fifth stock car race of the 2013 NASCAR Nationwide Series and the 17th iteration of the event. The race was held on Saturday, March 23, 2013, in Fontana, California, at Auto Club Speedway, a  permanent D-shaped oval racetrack. The race took the scheduled 150 laps to complete. At race's end, Joe Gibbs Racing driver Kyle Busch would dominate the race to win his 54th career NASCAR Nationwide Series win and his third of the season. To fill out the podium, Sam Hornish Jr. of Penske Racing and Regan Smith of JR Motorsports would finish second and third, respectively.

Background 

Auto Club Speedway (formerly California Speedway) is a 2 miles (3.2 km), low-banked, D-shaped oval superspeedway in Fontana, California which has hosted NASCAR racing annually since 1997. It is also used for open wheel racing events. The racetrack is located near the former locations of Ontario Motor Speedway and Riverside International Raceway. The track is owned and operated by International Speedway Corporation and is the only track owned by ISC to have naming rights sold. The speedway is served by the nearby Interstate 10 and Interstate 15 freeways as well as a Metrolink station located behind the backstretch.

Entry list

Practice 
The only two hours and 20 minutes practice session was held on Friday, March 22, at 1:40 PM PST.

Qualifying 
Qualifying was held on Saturday, March 23, at 10:35 AM PST. Each driver would have two laps to set a fastest time; the fastest of the two would count as their official qualifying lap.

Two drivers would fail to qualify: Tony Raines and Chase Miller.

Full qualifying results

Race results

References 

2013 NASCAR Nationwide Series
NASCAR races at Auto Club Speedway
March 2013 sports events in the United States
2013 in sports in California